Uwe Rosenberg (born 27 March 1970) is a German game designer and the co-founder of Lookout Games. He initially became known for his card game Bohnanza, which was successful both in Germany and internationally. He is known for complex economic strategy games, including Agricola and A Feast for Odin.

Works 
Born in Aurich, Germany, Rosenberg first began to occupy himself with the development and mechanisms of games at the age of 12. He published a number of play-by-mail games during his school years. While he was still in college, Amigo published his first major success, Bohnanza. Since finishing his statistics studies in Dortmund (the subject of his thesis was "Probability distributions in Memory"), his main occupation is the development of games.

In 2000, he and a few other game designers founded the publishing company Lookout Games. It published a number of expansions to Bohnanza, partly in cooperation with Hanno Girke. Larger projects were at first published at other publishers, such as Amigo and Kosmos.

Since 2005, Rosenberg has concentrated mostly on complex strategy games with an economic theme: his first, Agricola, was released in October 2007, went on to win a Spiel des Jahres special award for the best complex game of 2008, and has become a staple in the European game subgenre of worker placement games. It dethroned Puerto Rico as the highest rated game on BoardGameGeek.com in September 2008 and stayed at the top of the rankings until March 2010. A second game in this series, Le Havre, was published in October 2008, as well as Caverna in 2013. His highest rated game is currently A Feast for Odin, which was rated twenty second on BoardGameGeek.com as of December 2020. Many of Rosenberg's designs have also been recognized as being excellent for solitary play.

He married Susanne Balders on 18 May 2007. He lives in Gütersloh and works at his studio in Dortmund.

Games 
 Bohnanza (1997)
 Mamma mia (1998)
 Babel (2000)
 Bali (2001)
 Agricola (2007)
 Le Havre (2008)
 At the Gates of Loyang (2009)
 Merkator (2010)
 Ora et Labora (2011)
 Agricola: All Creatures Big and Small (2012)
 Le Havre: The Inland Port (2012)
 Caverna (2013)
 Glass Road (2013)
 Patchwork (2014)
 Fields of Arle (2014)
 Hengist (2015)
 A Feast for Odin (2016)
 Cottage Garden (2016)
 Caverna: Cave vs. Cave (2017)
 Indian Summer (2017)
 Nusfjord (2017)
 Reykholt (2018)
 Spring Meadow (2018)
 Caverna: Cave vs. Cave - Era II (2018)
 Robin Von Locksley (2019)
 Nova Luna (2019)
Fairy Trails (2020)
New York Zoo (2020)
Hallertau (2020)
Sagani (2020)
Armonia  (2021)
Tulpenfeiber (2021)
Atiwa (2022)

References

External links 
 Uwe Rosenberg's designer page at BoardGameGeek

1970 births
Board game designers
Living people